Dyffryn Cennen is a community located in Carmarthenshire, Wales. The population of the community taken at the 2011 census was 1,176.

The community is bordered by the communities of: Manordeilo and Salem; Llangadog; Cwmamman; Llandybie; Llanfihangel Aberbythych; and Llandeilo, all being in Carmarthenshire.

It includes the villages of Ffairfach and Trapp.

The community is part of the Llandeilo electoral ward for elections to Carmarthenshire County Council.

References

Communities in Carmarthenshire